Jim Lawrence may refer to:

 Jim Lawrence (baseball) (born 1939), Canadian baseball player
 Jim Lawrence (politician), American politician
 Jimmy Lawrence (American football) (1913–1990), football player for the Chicago Cardinals
 Jimmy Lawrence (1885–1934), Scottish footballer
 Jimmy Lawrence (footballer, born 1891) (1891–1970), English footballer
 Jim Lawrence (sailmaker), English artisan

See also
 James Lawrence (disambiguation)